"The Conspiracy" is the first play in the main series of Torchwood audio plays produced by Big Finish Productions. It was written by David Llewellyn and is a spin-off from the British science fiction television series Torchwood, itself a spin-off from Doctor Who.

It was released 15 September 2015 and stars John Barrowman reprising his role of Captain Jack Harkness and made available to purchase on CD and as a download.

Plot
George Wilson is a man who claims that the world is really under alien control and those who knew the truth have long since been silenced. Unfortunately for George no-one believes him. Captain Jack Harkness of Torchwood Three, however, knows George is right. The committee are here...

Writing
In May 2015, Big Finish announced that they had been granted permission to produce audiobooks based on Torchwood as part of a licensing agreement between themselves and BBC Worldwide, allowing them to use characters and concepts from the revived series of Doctor Who (2005–present) and its spin-offs in future productions. The company was formerly only permitted to use concepts from the series' original 1963–89 run and its self-titled 1996 TV film. The new Torchwood plays also received the blessing of Torchwood creator Russell T. Davies, who had been working with Gardner and former Big Finish producer Gary Russell to bring the show to the company since 2013.

References

External links

2015 audio plays
2015 radio dramas
Radio plays based on Torchwood